Sueli Correa Costa (25 July 1943 – 3 March 2023) was a Brazilian singer-songwriter and composer.

Biography
Born in Rio de Janeiro into a family of musicians, Costa grew up in Juiz de Fora, started playing the piano at the age of four, and learned to play the guitar by herself at the age of 15. She started her career as a composer in 1960 with the bossa-nova song "Balãozinho", and had her breakout in 1967, composing for Nara Leão the hit song  "Por exemplo você".  Among artists who recorded songs composed by her were Maria Bethânia, Elis Regina, Raimundo Fagner, Gal Costa, Cauby Peixoto, Ney Matogrosso, Simone, Ivan Lins,  Fátima Guedes,  Ithamara Koorax, Nana Caymmi, Joanna, Fafá de Belém.

Costa began her professional career as a singer in 1975 with the album Sueli Costa which included the hits "Dentro de Mim Mora um Anjo" and "Coração Ateu". In 1976 she formed a long professional association with lyricist Abel Silva. In 2002, Lucinha Lins honored her with a tribute album, Canção Brasileira, consisting of songs composed by Costa. Her last work was Sueli Costa Convida, a live album recorded in 2018 to celebrate her 50 years of career. Costa died on 4 March 2023, at the age of 79.

Discography    
Albums
 Sueli Costa -  1975
 Sueli Costa -  1977
 Vida de artista -  1978
 Louça final -  1980
 Íntimo -  1984
  Minha arte -  2000
 Amor blue - 2007
 Sueli Costa Convida -  2018

References

External links 
  
 

1943 births
2023 deaths
Brazilian women singers
Brazilian women composers
Música Popular Brasileira singers
Musicians from Rio de Janeiro (city)
Women in Latin music